Evans v. Eaton could refer to:
Evans v. Eaton (1818), 16 U.S. (3 Wheat.) 454, on patent anticipation and scope
Evans v. Eaton (1822), 20 U.S. (7 Wheat.) 356, on the need for patented improvements to be distinctly claimed